Casa do Pessoal do Porto do Lobito, also known as CPPL, is a multisports club from Lobito, Angola. It's men's basketball team competes at the Angolan Basketball league aka BIC Basket, as well as other local competitions organized by the Angolan Basketball Federation. Other prominent sports in the club are handball and roller hockey. The club is named after its major sponsor, Porto do Lobito (Lobito harbour) and its full name literally translates as Lobito Harbour Staff Club.

History
In the early 2000s, CPPL was a regular participant of the Angolan Basketball League. Financial shortages caused the senior basketball department to be suspended, only to be revamped in the early 2010s.

After an unsuccessful attempt to access the 2013–14 BAI Basket, (finished 3rd in the 2013 Angola Second Division Basketball Championship) CPPL was the runner-up at the 2014 tournament, thus gaining access to the 2015 BIC Basket.

In November 2014, shortly before the beginning of the league, the club announced that it would not participate in the championship citing financial reasons.

In the 2021–22 season, CPPL returned to the premier Angolan League after an absence since 2016.

Season by season

See also
CPPL Handball
CPPL Hockey
Angolan Basketball Federation

References

Sports clubs in Angola
Basketball teams in Angola